The Association of Volleyball Professionals (AVP) is the biggest and longest-running professional beach volleyball tour in the United States. Founded in 1983, the AVP is headquartered in Newport Beach, California. The AVP operates as a 3-tiered development system with AVPFirst, a youth program; AVPNext, a developmental circuit; and the AVP Pro Beach Volleyball Tour itself.

History

19831997: Origins and early history
The AVP was formed in 1983 as a player's union. Following a dispute with a private promoter at the 1984 World Championships in Redondo Beach, California, the AVP began organizing its own men's tour in 1984. The 1985 AVP tour included stops in eight U.S. states with a total prize money of US$275,000. The sport experienced significant growth in the 1980s and 1990s, and by 1993, the AVP tour had a total prize money of US$3.7 million, with ten events that were broadcast on NBC Sports and attended by over 600,000 people. The AVP began organizing women's events in 1993, competing with the Women's Professional Volleyball Association (WPVA), the main women's tour, that began in 1986.

The AVP had conflicts with the sport's international governing body, the Fédération Internationale de Volleyball (FIVB), in the 1980s and 1990s over regulations and sponsorship. This culminated in an initial boycott of FIVB Olympic qualification events by the top American players in the lead up to beach volleyball's Olympic debut at the 1996 Summer Olympics.  The boycott ended in mid-1995 after an agreement between both parties was reached.

19982010: Bankruptcies and restructuring

By 1997, sponsors started to withdraw due to the mounting financial problems and mismanagement in the AVP. In 1998, the AVP filed for bankruptcy and new management restructured the AVP from a players union to a for-profit privately owned company. The tour was bought out of bankruptcy the following year by Major League Volleyball and twelve events were held with a total prize money of US$1 million. In 2001, the tour was bought by Leonard Armato and his company Management Plus. The new tour combined the men's and women's professional tours. The tour also adopted the FIVB's smaller court size and rally scoring system, which upset many of the tour's players at the time.

In 2006, Crocs signed on as the title sponsor of the tour, which became known as the AVP Crocs Tour until its suspension in 2010. Other corporate sponsors for the tour included McDonald's, Nautica, Anheuser-Busch, Nature Valley and Xbox. By 2008, the AVP had an annual revenue of nearly US$25 million and were organizing as many as 31 events each year. However, the tour was hit badly by the financial crisis of 2007–2008 which saw it lose sponsors and revenue.

The AVP suspended its operations in August 2010, canceling the five remaining tournaments in the tour calendar and filing for bankruptcy once more. During the AVP's absence, two other domestic professional tours, the National Volleyball League (NVL) and the Jose Cuervo Pro Volleyball Beach Series, were formed.

2011present: Re-emergence

The AVP was bought in December 2010 by DFA PVA II Partners, LLC, and a tournament was held in Huntington Beach, California in October 2011. In April 2012, the AVP was bought by Donald Sun and two tournaments, the Cincinnati Open and the 2012 AVP Championships, were held later that year. The first full AVP season under Sun began in 2013. Facing competition from the NVL, the AVP required players competing on the 2017 AVP Pro Beach Volleyball Tour to sign a four-year exclusivity contract.

Since its re-emergence in 2013, the AVP Pro Beach Volleyball Tour has once again established itself as the biggest professional beach volleyball tour in the United States, with most of the top American players competing on the tour. International players are allowed to play on the AVP tour as well if they have dual citizenship or permanent residency in the United States. Notable international players on the tour include Brazil's Ricardo Santos and Canada's Sarah Pavan.

On July 13, 2021, casino operator Bally's Corporation announced that it had acquired the AVP. The tour will leverage Sinclair Broadcast Group's Bally Sports regional sports networks as a distribution channel for AVP events.

Rules
Since the 2017 season, there are two main differences between the AVP rules and standard beach volleyball rules. The first difference is that AVP matches have a "point freeze" at match point, wherein the scoring system changes from rally scoring (either team can score a point on every serve) to side-out scoring (only serving team can score a point) when either team reaches match point. This rule was introduced to allow for more comebacks. The second difference is that "let" serves, wherein the ball touches the net while crossing over into the opponent's court during service, are not allowed during "point freezes" and the serve will be replayed.

Tournament categories
The current tournament structure was introduced in 2017. AVP tournaments are categorized as either a "Gold Series" or "Open" event. Gold Series tournaments award more prize money and AVP national ranking points. For the 2017 Tour, Open events had a prize purse of US$150,000$158,000 while Gold Series events had a prize purse of US$175,000$225,000.

AVPNext and AVPFirst
AVPNext was started in 2014 as a developmental circuit, serving as a pipeline for future AVP Pro Beach Volleyball Tour players.
AVPNext tournaments enable players to earn AVP national ranking points which are required for qualification and seeding in the Pro Tour events. The highest-ranked AVPNext teams from each region at the end of the season also receive direct entry into the Manhattan Beach Open. For the 2019 season, the AVPNext Gold events had a prize purse of US$20,000–25,000.

AVPFirst was launched in 2015 as a non-profit youth development program aimed at increasing youth participation in the sport through beach volleyball clinics and events. The inaugural AVPFirst Championships were held in Hermosa Beach, California in 2016 for boys and girls in the under-12, under-14, under-16 and under-18 age groups. Teams qualified through a series of qualifying events throughout the country.

Television coverage
AVP tournaments are televised on NBC or NBCSN. From the 2018 season, almost every match from every AVP tournament will also be presented live and on demand through Amazon Prime Video.

AVP Awards
The AVP Awards Banquet takes place at the end of each year, honoring the tour's top performers based on statistics, player votes and AVP national ranking points earned during the year.

Men's award winners

Women's award winners

See also
FIVB Beach Volleyball World Tour

References

External links
 
 Beach Volleyball Database

 
Beach volleyball competitions
Volleyball organizations
1983 establishments in the United States
Sports in Newport Beach, California
Beach volleyball competitions in the United States
Organizations based in California
Sports competition series
Professional sports leagues in the United States